Marie-Claire Cremers (born 9 May 1969) known professionally as Amber is a Dutch-born singer, songwriter, label owner, and executive producer. She is best known for her hits "This Is Your Night", "If You Could Read My Mind", and "Sexual (Li Da Di)". In December 2016, Billboard ranked her as the 34th-most successful dance artist of all time.

Career

1996–1997: Debut album

Amber's music career took off when one of her demos, "This Is Your Night", was released by Tommy Boy Records. The single was on the Hot 100 chart for one year in 1996 and 1997. A full-length album of the same name soon followed. It included another hit single "One More Night".

1998–1999: Self-titled second album 

In 1999, Amber released her eponymous second album which garnered the most mainstream attention thus far. The first single "Sexual (Li Da Di)" achieved success in the US Billboard charts as well as charting across Europe. The album also included the single "If You Could Read My Mind" by Stars on 54 (a collaboration with Ultra Naté and Jocelyn Enriquez) which was featured on the soundtrack to the movie 54.

2000: Remixed and Grammy nomination

In 2000, Amber released the album Remixed, which contained remixes of all her previous singles, including "If You Could Read My Mind". It also included a non-album track "Taste the Tears", produced by Thunderpuss and was written by Diane Warren, which had previously appeared on the TV soundtrack for Sex and The City. The TV series had used Amber's titles "Above the Clouds" and "Object of Your Desire" prior.

In 2001, she received a Grammy nomination as the co- writer of "Love One Another" for Cher's cover version, and she co-wrote music for Bette Midler.

2001–2003: Naked and departure from Tommy Boy Records

Amber's third album Naked was released in early 2002. Musically, Amber continued the path she had started with: she continued to co-write her own songs and lyrics and attempted even more of a departure from her original Eurodance sound. Amber parted ways with Tommy Boy Records after her third album because of creative differences.

2004–2006: My Kind of World

Amber's fourth album, My Kind of World, was the first to be released on her own label JMCA Enterprises, and was more personal and moodier than her previous releases. The album did not gain mainstream attention. Three singles were taken from the album, "You Move Me", "Voodoo" and "Just Like That".

2008–present: Remixes and current status

In 2008, she re-released her debut single "This Is Your Night" with new remixes. The song had not been made available digitally, as Tommy Boy Records defaulted in 2001 and gave Warner Music all their masters, where they were shelved instead of distributed. In 2006, she collaborated with the producer Sweet Rains and wrote and released a title named "Melt with the Sun". In August 2008, she collaborated with Zelma Davis of C+C Music Factory fame on a cover of "No More Tears (Enough Is Enough)", the classic duet by Donna Summer and Barbra Streisand. Both songs were accompanied by new music videos. In 2009, she released another single named "I Don't Believe in Hate (Drip Drop)". All of her singles were released with multiple remixes.

In 2009, Amber was the closing act at Baltimore's gay pride festival on Saturday 20 June 2009. In 2010, she was the closing act at Pittsburgh's gay pride festival on 13 June 2010. Amber was one of the headlining performers at the Portland Pride Festival on 20 June 2010. She was also the closing act at Providence Gay Pride on 19 June 2010. Amber performed as one of the headline acts at 2013 Stonewall Summer Pride in Wilton Manors, Florida.

In June 2021 Reservoir Media purchased Amber's former label Tommy Boy Music. Amber announced on her social media that Reservoir has plans to issue remixes that were previously unavailable commercially. "Sexual (Li Da Di)" [Plasma Trance Remix - Extended], the first of many upcoming singles according to the artist's social media, was released on 27 May 2022.

The Hits Remixed - Extended Versions, which was previously unavailable commercially, was released to all digital platforms internationally in June 2022.  The long form compilation album is the second of four planned releases of Amber vault remixes. The album includes full length remixes of the #1 club hits "If You Could Read My Mind," "Sexual (Li Da Di)," "Above the Clouds," "Love One Another," among others.

On 11 July 2022 Amber announced via her social media platforms that a previously unreleased Remix EP of Above the Clouds would be issued digitally on 15 July. This EP includes the full length Thunderpuss club mixes.

Discography

Albums

Studio albums

Compilation albums

 Remixed (2000)
 Undanced (2004)
 Undanced II (2007)

Singles

See also

List of Billboard number-one dance club songs
List of artists who reached number one on the U.S. Dance Club Songs chart
Mononymous person

References

1969 births
Living people
People from Ubbergen
Dutch dance musicians
Dutch house musicians
Dutch pop singers
Dutch singer-songwriters
English-language singers from the Netherlands
Eurodance musicians
Women rock singers
Women in electronic music
21st-century Dutch women singers
21st-century Dutch singers
Dutch emigrants to Germany